Kenneth Charles Cope (born 14 April 1931) is an English retired actor and scriptwriter. He is best known for his roles as Marty Hopkirk in Randall and Hopkirk (Deceased), Jed Stone in Coronation Street and Ray Hilton in Brookside.

Early life
Kenneth Cope was born on 14 April 1931 in Liverpool, Lancashire, England.

Career
Cope began playing character roles in films from the mid 1950s, and between 1961 and 1966, gained attention for his regular role in Coronation Street as the shady Jed Stone, a part he returned to in 2008. The appearance led to the recording of a novelty pop single, "Hands Off, Stop Mucking About", with Tony Hatch. Although it was not a hit, it led to a regular slot as a disc jockey with Radio Luxembourg.

Cope also appeared in the satirical series That Was The Week That Was from 1962 until 1963.

He played Subutai in the 1965 film of the life of Genghis Khan, and in the same year appeared in Dateline Diamonds playing Lester Benson. In 1967 he appeared as Tom Savage in "The Bird Who Knew Too Much" episode of The Avengers.

In Randall and Hopkirk (Deceased) (1969–1970), Cope played the ghost private eye Marty Hopkirk opposite Mike Pratt's Jeff Randall.

He also took leading roles in two Carry On films. In Carry On at Your Convenience (1971) he played Vic Spanner, the obnoxious shop steward central to the film's trade union and industrial problems storyline and the rival in the film's romantic sub-plot. In Carry On Matron (1972) he took the more sympathetic role of Cyril Carter, the son of a thief who is forced to impersonate a female nurse as part of his father's attempt to rob a maternity hospital. Once there, Cyril finds love with a real nurse.

In an episode of the first series of The Adventures of Black Beauty, "Sailor on a Horse" (1972), he played Henry Thackery, a missing heir from Canada, returning from sea, just in time to save the land and Beauty's paddock next to the Gordon family, which greedy, contentious lawyer Weems tries to sell by fraud, palming one of his clerks off as being the true heir. 

He appeared as Jack Victor in Catweazle ("The Wogle Stone") in 1971. In 1975–1976 he wrote three series of the BBC children's television series Striker, starring the young Kevin Moreton and inspired by the local youth football team in the village of Islip, Oxfordshire, where the Cope family was then living. Other screenwriting credits include A Sharp Intake of Breath.

Cope featured in three episodes of Minder playing different characters: newly released prisoner Arthur Stubbs in "Bury My Half at Waltham Green"; 'Scooter' in "Waiting for Goddard"; and police informer Phelan in "Bring Me the Head of Arthur Daley".

He later appeared in the Doctor Who story Warriors' Gate (in 1981), and guest-starred in four episodes of Casualty, as well as taking roles in Juliet Bravo,The Bill, Waking the Dead, A Touch of Frost and Kavanagh QC.

In 1984, Cope starred in Bootle Saddles, an ill-conceived surreal sitcom about a failing themed 'cowboy village' on the outskirts of Merseyside. He played the lead character Percy James, who was passionate about the park despite the poor financial returns. The series appeared to be less a parody and more a sort of homage to 1950s and 1960s westerns, with episodes structured loosely around epics like High Noon and The Magnificent Seven. The characters rarely strayed out of their diegetic cowboy personas, despite the contemporary setting. The series was axed after one season.

In 1995, he appeared in the same episode of Out of the Blue as his daughter Martha.

In 1997, Cope played dodgy ex-copper Charlie Fairclough alongside David Jason in an episode of A Touch of Frost titled "True Confessions".

From 1999 to 2002 he played Ray Hilton in the Channel 4 soap opera Brookside.

Cope was offered a cameo role in the 2000–2001 revival of Randall and Hopkirk starring Vic Reeves and Bob Mortimer, but turned it down. He did, however, feature on the "Behind the Scenes" section of the Series 1 DVD, wishing the cast of the remake well. He also provided the foreword to a Randall and Hopkirk retrospective book (by Geoff Tibballs), published in 1994.
In addition, an 'Appreciation', written by Cope, was included in Annette André's 2018 autobiography Where have I been all My Life?.

Cope played Neville Harding in 2004's "Shadowplay" (Series 4, episodes 11 and 12 of Waking the Dead).

In 2008, Cope's Coronation Street character Jed Stone returned to the ITV soap after 42 years' absence, appearing as part of a storyline involving property developer Tony Gordon. The character was kept onscreen for several months before being written out again, and marked Kenneth Cope's final acting gig.

Personal life
Cope married actress Renny Lister, whom he had met when she worked on Coronation Street, in 1961. They had two sons and a daughter together and lived in Witney, Oxfordshire. Their sons Nick and Mark Cope went on to form a rock band, The Candyskins. Their daughter, Martha Cope, is an actress. In 1997, Lister announced her retirement.

In 1974, Cope and his wife opened a restaurant, in Watlington, Oxfordshire, named Martha's Kitchen after his daughter.

Cope was diagnosed with mesothelioma in 2000, but six years later he was told this was a misdiagnosis; he now suffers from chronic obstructive pulmonary disease.

In January 2014, Cope appeared as a character witness during the trial of former Coronation Street colleague William Roache, who plays Ken Barlow in the series.

Cope now resides in Southport, and writes a weekly column for the weekly Southport Visiter newspaper.

Filmography

Impulse (1954) as Hotel Desk Clerk (uncredited)
The Gilded Cage (1955) as Hotel Receptionist (uncredited)
Doublecross (1956) as Jeffrey
X the Unknown (1956) as Private Lansing
Yangtse Incident: The Story of H.M.S. Amethyst (1957) as Store's Rating HMS Amythest
These Dangerous Years (1957) as The Juggler
Dunkirk (1958) as Lt. Lumpkin
No Time to Die (1958) as 2nd English Soldier
Naked Fury (1959) as Johnny
The Lady Is a Square (1959) as Dereck
Jungle Street (1960) as Johnny 
The Criminal (1960) as Kelly 
The Unstoppable Man (1961) as Benny
Edgar Wallace Mysteries (1962) as Derek Maitland
Tomorrow at Ten (1962) as Sergeant Grey
The Damned (1963) as Sid
Carry On Jack (1963) as Sailor (uncredited)
Father Came Too! (1963) as Ron
Change Partners (1965) as Joe Trent
Genghis Khan (1965) as Subotai
Dateline Diamonds (1965) as Lester Benson
Night of the Big Heat (1967) as Tinker Mason
Hammerhead (1968) as Motorcyclist
A Twist of Sand (1968) as Flag Officer
The Desperados (1969) as Carlin
A Touch of the Other (1970) as Delger
She'll Follow You Anywhere (1971) as Mike Carter
Catweazle (1971) ("The Wogle Stone") as Jack Victor
Carry On at Your Convenience (1971) as Vic Spanner
Carry On Matron (1972) as Cyril Carter
Rentadick (1972) as West
The Adventures of Black Beauty (1972) 'Sailor on a Horse' as Henry Thackery
Juggernaut (1974) as Bridgeman
Minder -
 (1979) "Bury My Half at Waltham Green" as Arthur Stubbs
 (1985) "Waiting for Goddard" as 'Scooter'
 (1994)  "Bring Me the Head of Arthur Daley" as Phelan
George and Mildred (1980) as Harvey
The Bill (1991) 'Its a small world' as PC Len Dorton
Captives (1994) as Dr. Hockley
Last of the Summer Wine (1997 & 2008) as Lance (2 episodes)

References

External links
 (Note: this source gives a birth date of 14 June)

1931 births
English male television actors
Living people
Male actors from Liverpool